The 1992–93 La Liga season, the 62nd since its establishment, started on September 5, 1992, and finished on June 20, 1993. 

Barcelona won the title for the third successive season, finishing a single point ahead of Real Madrid.

Team information

Clubs and locations

League table

Results

Relegation playoff

First Leg

Second Leg

Pichichi Trophy

1992 1993
1992–93 in Spanish football leagues
Spain